Captain Charles de Bois Murray (1891 – 19 March 1974), was a Scottish judge, politician and writer. He served as Sheriff in Renfrewshire and Berwickshire, and as a Liberal Party candidate.

Background
Murray was born the eldest son of C.R. Murray. He was educated at The Glasgow Academy and Glasgow University. In 1929 he married Hope Cruickshank Smith. They had one son and one daughter.

Political career
Murray was Liberal candidate for the Tradeston division of Glasgow at the 1922 General Election. He was then Liberal candidate for the Midlothian and Peebles Northern division at the 1923 General Election. He did not stand for parliament again.

Electoral record

Publications
Forbes of Culloden, 1936
How Scotland is Governed, 1938 (second ed. revised, 1947)
Rebuilding Europe, 1944
The Law of Wills in Scotland, 1945
The Future of Scots Law, 1961

References

1891 births
1974 deaths
People educated at the Glasgow Academy
Alumni of the University of Glasgow
Members of the Inner Temple
20th-century Scottish judges
Scottish political writers
Liberal Party (UK) parliamentary candidates
20th-century Scottish historians
Historians of Scotland
Scottish legal writers